Blame! (stylized as BLAME!) is a Japanese science fiction manga series written and illustrated by Tsutomu Nihei. It was published by Kodansha in the seinen manga magazine Monthly Afternoon from 1997 to 2003, with its chapters collected in ten tankōbon volumes. A six-part original net animation was produced in 2003, with a seventh episode included on the DVD release. An anime film adaptation by Polygon Pictures was released as a Netflix original in May 2017.

Synopsis

Setting

Blame! is set in what is simply known as "The City", a gigantic megastructure now occupying much of what used to be the Solar System. Its exact size is unknown, but Tsutomu Nihei suggested its diameter to be at least that of Jupiter's orbit, or about 1.6 billion kilometers. In the manga, this is also suggested by Killy crossing an empty, spherical room roughly the size of Jupiter, suggesting that the planet had been there but was disassembled as the City grew.

As revealed in the prequel NOiSE, the City began as a much smaller structure on Earth, created by humans with the aid of the robotic "Builders." Humanity controlled the Builders through the Netsphere, a hyper-developed version of the Internet accessible only to those with an identificatory genetic marker known as the Net Terminal Gene. Any humans without the gene who attempted to access the Netsphere were exterminated by a special task force known as the Safeguards. Eventually however, a terrorist cult known as "the Order" released a virus that made all humans lose their Net Terminal Genes, thus cutting off their access to the Netsphere and their control over the Builders. Without specific instructions, the Builders began to build chaotically and indefinitely, while the Safeguards' programming degraded into killing all humans without the Net Terminal Gene whether they wanted to access the Netsphere or not.

By the time of the events of the manga, the City has basically become a series of layered, concentric Dyson spheres filled with haphazard architecture, largely devoid of life. These layers compose the supporting scaffold of the City, known as the Megastructure. The Megastructure is extremely durable, with only a direct blast from a Gravitational Beam Emitter being able to drill through it. In addition, the underside of each Megastructure layer periodically illuminates the overside of the one below to provide a day–night cycle. Traveling between layers is generally challenging due to the City's chaotic layout and the dangerous Safeguard response such endeavor may cause, with the means to do so being either climbing stairs for days or taking elevators that reach relativistic speeds. The buildings on each layer are largely uninhabited, although scattered human tribes, rogue Builders, and hostile Safeguards and Silicon Life can be found throughout the entire City.

Plot

Killy, a silent loner possessing an incredibly powerful weapon known as a Gravitational Beam Emitter, wanders a vast technological world known as "The City". He is searching for Net Terminal Genes, a (possibly) extinct genetic marker that allows humans to access the "Netsphere", a sort of computerized control network for The City. The City is an immense volume of artificial structure, separated into massive "floors" by nearly-impenetrable barriers known as "Megastructure". The City is inhabited by scattered human and transhuman tribes as well as hostile cyborgs known as Silicon Life. The Net Terminal Genes appear to be the key to halting the unhindered, chaotic expansion of the Megastructure, as well as a way of stopping the murderous robot horde known as the Safeguard from destroying all of humanity.

Along the way, Killy meets and joins forces with a resourceful engineer named Cibo. Their quest is indirectly supported by the City's Authority, which is unable to stop the Safeguard from opposing them. Together, Killy and Cibo meet a young girl named Sanakan and a tribe of human warriors called the Electro-Fishers. Killy's cybernetic abilities are restored after he is attacked by a high-level Safeguard, which turns out to have been Sanakan in disguise. She transforms into her Safeguard form and attacks the Electro-Fishers' village when discovered. Killy and Cibo defend the Electro-Fishers by bringing them to the cylindrical megastructure of Toha Heavy Industries. Here they meet Mensab, an AI independent from the Administration, and her guardian Seu, a human. The megastructure is ultimately destroyed due to attacks by Silicon Life and Sanakan, but Mensab is able to give Cibo a sample of Seu's DNA.

Killy and Cibo next come to a region of the City ruled by a group of Silicon Life, where they ally with a pair of "provisional Safeguards" named Dhomochevsky and Iko. Seu's DNA is stolen by the Silicon leader, Davine, who uses it to access the Netsphere. Dhomochevsky sacrifices his life to kill Davine, but not before she downloads an extremely powerful Level 9 Safeguard from the Netsphere which manifests in Cibo's body. The Cibo Safeguard destroys the entire region.

14 years later, Killy's body repairs itself from the attack and he continues his journey. He discovers that Cibo, having lost her memory, was eventually rescued by Sanakan, who is now allied with the Authority against the rest of the Safeguard. Cibo's body is incubating a "sphere" which contains her genetic information. Ultimately, Cibo and Sanakan both die in a final confrontation with the Safeguard, but Killy survives and preserves the sphere. An AI he previously met whose body was destroyed is seen in a virtual reality, recalling his quest an unknown amount of time later. Killy finally reaches the edge of the City, where he is shot in the head and incapacitated, but a flood of water carries him to the surface of the City where stars are visible and the sphere begins to hatch. In the final page, Killy is seen fighting in the corridors of the City again, now accompanied by a small child wearing a hazmat suit.

Media

Manga
Blame! was written and illustrated by Tsutomu Nihei. The series ran in Kodansha's Monthly Afternoon from 1997 to 2003. Its chapters were collected in ten tankōbon volumes (tankōbon) by Kodansha's Afternoon KC imprint. 

In February 2005, Tokyopop announced that it has licensed Blame! for U.S. distribution, with publication beginning in August 2005. After releasing the final volume in 2007, the series has gone out of print with several volumes becoming increasingly hard to find. In February 2016, Vertical announced that it had licensed the series.

Volumes
 Tankōbon release

 Master's edition

Blame! Academy
 is a spin-off series of Blame!. Set in the same "City" as Blame!, it is a parody and comedy about various characters in the main Blame! story in a traditional Japanese school setting. Various elements in the main Blame! story are being parodied, including the relationship between Killy and Cibo, and Dhomochevsky and Iko. It was irregularly published in Afternoon. A compilation volume, titled Blame Academy! and So On was published by Kodansha on September 19, 2008.

Blame!2
, subtitled , is a full-color, 16-page one-shot. Like NSE: Net Sphere Engineer, Blame!2 is a sequel to the original Blame!, taking place at a point in the distant future. It was published March 21, 2008 in the second volume of Kodansha's Weekly Morning Special Edition magazine, Mandala. This one-shot was also compiled in one volume with Blame! Academy, titled Blame Academy! and So On in 2008. Set an undefined but long time after the events of Blame!, it follows an incarnation of P-cell. After Killy's success in Blame!, humanity has begun to dominate The City once more and began wiping out most Silicon Life. After P-cell escapes the extinction as the sole survivor of her kind (which is beset by humanity and the Safeguard), she is saved from death by Killy. She eventually makes it to the edge of the City, where it is implied she travels to another planet and restarts Silicon Life civilization using the stored gene-data of her dead companions.

NSE: Net Sphere Engineer
 is a sequel to Blame!. It was originally published as a one-shot in the Bessatsu Morning magazine. This one-shot was compiled in one volume with Blame! Academy, titled Blame Academy! and So On in 2008. NSE: Net Sphere Engineer follows a "Dismantler", a Net Sphere Engineer in charge of disabling the remaining nexus towers that summon Safeguard interference upon its detection of humans without the net terminal genes. Like Blame!2, NSE is set in a long but undefined time period after the events of Blame!. However, it is implied it is even later than Blame!2 as Safeguards are now very rare encounters.

Blame!: The Ancient Terminal City
A trailer revealing a special Blame! short, appearing at the beginning of the 8th episode of Knights of Sidonia: Battle for Planet Nine (the second season of the anime adaptation of Knights of Sidonia), was released in November 2014. The episode aired in May 2015. The short is contextualized as a TV program that the people of Sidonia tune in for.

Film

Plans for a full-length CG animated film were announced in 2007. However, this proposed CG film project was not released before Micott and Basara (the studio hired) filed for bankruptcy in 2011. It was announced in November 2015 that the series will get an anime theatrical film adaptation. The film is directed by Hiroyuki Seshita and written by Tsutomu Nihei and Sadayuki Murai, with animation by Polygon Pictures and character designs by Yuki Moriyama. It was released globally as a Netflix original on the 20th of May 2017.

On October 5, 2017, Viz Media announced at their New York Comic Con panel that they licensed the home video rights to the film. They released it on Blu-ray Disc and DVD on March 27, 2018.

Reception
Jarred Pine from Mania.com commented "[it] is not an easy task" to talk about the story in the first volume as "it leaves quite a gamut of questions open for the reader, nothing on the surface to give the reader a sense of direction or purpose." Pine said Blame! doesn't have a mass appeal and "there will be quite a strong line dividing those who love and hate Nihei’s unique and convoluted cyberpunk journey."

In 2006 the Tokyopop distribution was nominated for a Harvey Award in the category 'Best American Edition of Foreign Material'.

References

External links

Blame!
1997 manga
2003 anime OVAs
2004 manga
2008 manga
Action anime and manga
Artificial intelligence in fiction
Augmented reality in fiction
Brain–computer interfacing in fiction
Cyberpunk anime and manga
Cyborgs in fiction
Fiction about consciousness transfer
Fiction about immortality
Fiction set in the 7th millennium or beyond
Group TAC
Kodansha manga
Malware in fiction
Manga adapted into films
Media Blasters
Nanotechnology in fiction
Post-apocalyptic anime and manga
Production I.G
Prosthetics in fiction
Fiction about robots
Seinen manga
Tokyopop titles
Transhumanism in fiction
Tsutomu Nihei
Vertical (publisher) titles
Virtual reality in fiction
Terrorism in fiction